William Walter may refer to:
 William Walter (poet) (fl. c.1525–1533), English poet and translator
 William Walter (MP) (died 1555), Member of Parliament for Buckingham 1553
 Sir William Walter (MP for Peterborough) (1574–1632), MP for Peterborough 1614, Ludgershall 1626 and Lichfield 1628
 William Walter (boxer) (born 1906), German boxer
 William Grey Walter (1910–1977), American neurophysiologist
 William Walter, partner in the Walter and Wilson architectural firm with James Keys Wilson
 William Walter (printer), founder of Scripture Gift Mission in 1888
 William W. Walter (1869-1941), American religious leader
 Sir William Walter, 1st Baronet (1604–1675), MP for Weobley

See also

William Walters (disambiguation)